Mark Thomas Pavelich (February 28, 1958 – March 4, 2021) was an American professional ice hockey forward who played 355 regular season games in the National Hockey League (NHL) for the New York Rangers, Minnesota North Stars, and San Jose Sharks between 1981 and 1991. Pavelich was a member of the 1980 U.S. Olympic hockey team that won the gold medal in what has been called the "Miracle on Ice".

Amateur career
The son of Croatian immigrants, Pavelich grew up in rural Eveleth, Minnesota. He was a star performer on his high school hockey team, Eveleth High School. He attended the University of Minnesota Duluth as an amateur player for three seasons from 1977 to 1979. Pavelich is best known for being a member of the 1980 U.S. Olympic hockey team that won the gold medal in Lake Placid. In the game against the Soviet Union, Pavelich was credited with two assists, including one on Mike Eruzione's game-winning goal.

Professional career
After the Olympics, Pavelich, who was not drafted by an NHL team, played one season for HC Lugano in Switzerland where he registered 73 points. He returned to the U.S. national team for the 1981 Ice Hockey World Championship tournament. He was brought back to the United States the following year by his former U.S. Olympic coaches Herb Brooks and Craig Patrick, who managed the New York Rangers. Despite his size, Pavelich thrived in his role as a center for the Rangers, and holds the Rangers record for most points as a rookie (76). However, his career in New York was ended by a feud with Brooks' successor Ted Sator, who introduced a traditional North American dump-and-chase style of play.

Pavelich briefly played for Brooks with the Minnesota North Stars in 1987 before returning to Europe. He had a stint in Britain for the Dundee Rockets and played two seasons in Italy for HC Bolzano. The expansion San Jose Sharks brought him out of retirement for the 1991–92 NHL season, but he would play only two games for the Sharks before retiring. However, he did record an assist on the Sharks' first-ever goal scored by Craig Coxe in the third period of a 4–3 loss to the Vancouver Canucks on October 4, 1991.

On February 23, 1983, Pavelich became the first American to score five goals in a single game, against the Hartford Whalers at Madison Square Garden. This feat has only been matched by an American once when Tage Thompson scored five goals against the Columbus Blue Jackets on December 7, 2022.

Legacy
In the 2009 book 100 Ranger Greats, the authors ranked Pavelich at No. 83 all-time of the 901 New York Rangers who had played during the team's first 82 seasons.

In October 2022, he was inaugurated in the Croatian-American Sports Hall of Fame.

Personal life
Pavelich married Sue Koski on September 11, 1985. The couple had one daughter, Tarja, in 1987 and divorced in 1989. He married Kara Burmachuk in 1994, and they had no children.

When Pavelich was 18, he killed 15-year-old Ricky Holgers in a hunting incident which authorities deemed accidental. His second wife Kara died at age 44 in a fall that authorities deemed accidental from a second-story balcony at their Lutsen, Minnesota, home on September 6, 2012.  To “some,” the death was “suspicious.” 

In April 2014, Pavelich put his Olympic medal up for auction, with bidding beginning at $62,500. The medal sold in May 2014 for $262,900 through Dallas-based auction house Heritage Auctions.

Health and legal issues
Pavelich was arrested on August 15, 2019, for assaulting a neighbor with whom he had earlier been fishing, after he believed the neighbor had put something into his beer. He was charged with four felony counts: second and third-degree assault, possession of a short-barreled shotgun, and possession of a firearm with a missing or altered serial number. Pavelich was ruled incompetent to stand trial and was ordered committed to a secure treatment facility. In August 2020, Pavelich was granted court approval for transfer to a lower-security setting for treatment. Pavelich's sister, Jean Gevik, stated that she believed he was suffering from chronic traumatic encephalopathy (CTE), and had noticed behavioral changes in the years leading up to the incident which led to his arrest.

Pavelich died on March 3, 2021, at a residential treatment center in Sauk Centre, Minnesota. His death was ruled a suicide by asphyxiation.

In popular culture
In Miracle on Ice, a 1981 TV movie about the 1980 U.S. hockey team, Pavelich was played by Jack Blessing.

In the 2004 Disney film Miracle, he is played by Chris Koch. Koch played junior hockey for the Delta Ice Hawks in his native Canada before concussions ended his career.

Awards and achievements

Career statistics

Regular season and playoffs

International

References

External links
 

1958 births
2021 deaths
1980 US Olympic ice hockey team
AHCA Division I men's ice hockey All-Americans
American expatriate ice hockey players in Italy
American expatriate ice hockey players in Scotland
American men's ice hockey centers
American people of Croatian descent
Bolzano HC players
Dundee Rockets players
Ice hockey players from Minnesota
Ice hockey players at the 1980 Winter Olympics
Medalists at the 1980 Winter Olympics
Minnesota Duluth Bulldogs men's ice hockey players
Minnesota North Stars players
New York Rangers players
Olympic gold medalists for the United States in ice hockey
San Jose Sharks players
Sportspeople from Eveleth, Minnesota
Undrafted National Hockey League players
ZSC Lions players
Suicides by asphyxiation